The 2012–13 Elche CF season is the 80th season in club history.

Review and events

Competitions

Segunda División

Matches

Copa Del Rey

Squad

Squad, matches played and goals scored

Minutes played

Starting 11
Manu Herrera

Jordi Xumetra

Coro

Bookings

Sources

Elche CF
Elche CF seasons